Kviteseidvatn (or Kviteseidvatnet) is a lake in the municipality of Kviteseid in Vestfold og Telemark county, Norway.  The lake is part of the Telemark Canal and lies in the Skein watershed.

Kviteseidvatn's inlet is via ‘’Strauman’’  from lake Bandak, and it discharges via the ‘’Straumen’’ to Flåvatn.

See also
List of lakes in Norway

References and notes

Lakes of Vestfold og Telemark